Live at San Quentin is a 1990 live album by blues guitarist B.B. King performed at San Quentin State Prison in Marin County, California.

Track listing
"B.B. King Intro" (Riley King)
"Let the Good Times Roll" (Sam Theard, Fleecie Moore)
"Every Day I Have the Blues" (Memphis Slim)
"Whole Lotta Loving" (Jules Bihari, Riley King)
"Sweet Little Angel" (Riley King, Jules Taub)
"Never Make a Move Too Soon" (Stix Hooper, Will Jennings)
"Into the Night" (Ira Newborn)
"Ain't Nobody's Bizness" (Porter Grainger, Everett Robbins)
"The Thrill is Gone" (Rick Darnell, Roy Hawkins)
"Peace to the World" (Trade Martin)
"Nobody Loves Me But My Mother" (Riley King)
"Sweet Sixteen" (Riley King, Joe Josea)
"Rock Me Baby" (Riley King, Joe Josea)

Personnel
Bass Guitar – Michael Doster
Drums – Calep Emphrey
Guitar – Leon Warren
Keyboards – Eugene Carrier
Lead Vocals, Guitar – B.B. King
Musical Director, Saxophone – Walter King
Saxophone – Edgar Synigal
Trumpet – James Bolden

References

B.B. King live albums
1990 live albums
MCA Records live albums
Prison music